The Peninsula Chicago is a hotel located at the intersection of East Superior Street and North Michigan Avenue in Chicago, Illinois. The hotel is part of The Peninsula Hotels group based in Hong Kong. The Peninsula Hotel group's parent Hongkong and Shanghai Hotels, who already owned 92.5% of the Chicago property's shares, purchased the remainder of the shares that it did not already own in late 2009, giving it full ownership of the hotel.

Design
The Peninsula Chicago's architecture is inspired by the Peninsula group's flagship property in Hong Kong. Both hotels share the layout of arm-like wings projecting from the central section like a throne. The Chicago hotel's podium and high rise are derived from the flagship's original building and 30-story tower expansion, respectively. The Chicago hotel's Michigan Avenue side has a topside curtain wall and corduroy concrete patterns beneath the windows, similar to its Hong Kong forebear's historical facade. The Chicago hotel also has a two-story sky lobby, and the Superior Street entrance is flanked by Chinese marble lions, and most of its interior décor is similar to the Hong Kong hotel.

Designed by Elkus/Manfredi Architects of Boston and constructed by the Thomas J. Klutznick Co. of Chicago, the complex is a mixed-use project consisting of Phase 1, a 235,000-sf retail block that opened in 1997, and Phase 2, the 390,000-sf 339-room hotel that was completed in 2001.  The high rise portion is set back from Michigan Avenue to reinforce the three-to four-story street-level scale, which allows the midday sun to filter into Water Tower Park.

Location
Due to the hotel's proximity to Oak Street and the Magnificent Mile (Michigan Avenue), the building is within walking distance to Chanel, Armani, Gucci, and Louis Vuitton. As with most hotels in the area, the bottom floors are occupied by retailers, in this case Tiffany & Co., Ralph Lauren and Banana Republic. The hotel is also close to several tourist attractions such as the Chicago Water Tower, the John Hancock Center and American Girl Store. The hotel is about 30–60 minutes from the two main Chicago airports depending on traffic. The closest 'L' station to the hotel is the Chicago station on the Red Line which is a 5-minute walk away.

Features
The hotel offers limousine service to and from O'Hare International Airport and Chicago Midway International Airport. For business events and meetings the hotel has over  available which includes boardrooms and a business center. For rooms, there are a total of 339 guestrooms and suites available. The hotel has three restaurants: Shanghai Terrace, Pierrot Gourmet, The Lobby and Z Bar serving Cantonese/Shanghainese, European, American cuisine small plates, and Global cuisine shared plates respectively. There are private dining rooms in Shanghai Terrace and Z Bar that are used for business meetings and special events.

The bar is named simply The Bar. The Fitness Centre takes up the top two floors. The top two floors are different from the rest of the hotel because the pool room has floor to ceiling windows to optimize the view of Lake Michigan from the  pool. The Fitness Centre also contains a spa which was awarded the Best Urban Spa Hotel by Spa Finder in 2007 and 2008. The city's only hotel ice skating rink (Sky Rink) is situated on the mezzanine.

Awards 
In 2018 the hotel was awarded the #2 best hotel in the U.S. by U.S. News & World Report and in 2017 the Travel + Leisure magazine's award for #1 Hotel in Chicago. The Peninsula is one of only four 5-star hotels in Chicago, the others being the Four Seasons Hotel Chicago, The Langham Chicago, and Trump Tower Chicago.

See also
The Peninsula New York
The Peninsula Bangkok
The Peninsula Manila
The Peninsula Hong Kong

References

External links 
 

Hotels in Chicago
Chicago
Skyscraper hotels in Chicago
Ice rinks
2001 establishments in Illinois
Hotels established in 2001
Hotel buildings completed in 2001